Jerry Slavonia (born June 3, 1967) is an entrepreneur, founder and CEO of Nestigator, co-founder and former CEO of CampusExplorer.com  and former senior executive of Rent.com

As the director of business development and Internet marketing, Slavonia joined Rent.com when it was still known as Viva.com in May 2001, and oversaw its growth to 36 million annual visits by 2005, when Rent.com was acquired by eBay for $433 million.  He is also a founder of Campus Explorer, a college search and planning service, which he led from inception, when it achieved 1 million visitors in the first quarter of 2009, to the seventh fastest-growing Internet company by 2013.

His current venture, Nestigator.com is a personalized real-estate search engine founded in 2014 that aims to reinvent and simplify the moving experience. The Nestigator website officially launched May 2015, and is active in more than 100 markets throughout the nation.

References

American computer businesspeople
1967 births
Living people